Canadian Sunset is a compilation album by American pop singer Andy Williams that was released in the spring of 1965 by Columbia Records. The cover bears the phrase "formerly titled Andy Williams' Best" underneath the title, suggesting that the same songs can be found here that were on that 1961 release by Cadence Records, but his number one hit "Butterfly" and its top 10 follow-up "I Like Your Kind of Love" that were included on the Cadence album were replaced on this release with the B-sides of two of the other songs here.

This album made its first appearance on the Billboard Top LPs chart in the issue dated July 3, 1965, and remained there for six weeks, peaking at number 112.

Track listing

Side one
 "The Bilbao Song" (Bertolt Brecht, Johnny Mercer, Kurt Weill) - 2:15
 "The Hawaiian Wedding Song" (Al Hoffman, Charles E. King, Dick Manning) - 2:29
 "Lonely Street" (Carl Belew, Kenny Sowder, W.S. Stevenson) - 2:46
 "Do You Mind?" (Lionel Bart) - 2:17
 "(In the Summertime) You Don't Want My Love" (Roger Miller) - 2:16
 "Are You Sincere?" (Wayne Walker) - 2:41

Side two
 "The Village of St. Bernadette" (Eula Parker) - 3:22
 "Canadian Sunset" (Norman Gimbel, Eddie Heywood) - 2:37
 "Don't Go to Strangers" (Redd Evans, Arthur Kent, David Mann) - 2:56
 "How Wonderful to Know" (Salvatore d'Esposito, Kermit Goell, Domenico Titomanlio) - 2:21
 "Summer Love" (Kay Thompson) - 2:52
 "Dreamsville" (Ray Evans, Jay Livingston, Henry Mancini) - 2:59

Recording dates
Cadence Records founder Archie Bleyer provided Billboard magazine with the following:

July 2, 1956 - "Canadian Sunset"
December 12, 1957 - "Are You Sincere"
November 3, 1958 - "Hawaiian Wedding Song"
August 23, 1959 - "Lonely Street", "Summer Love"
November 19, 1959 - "The Village of St. Bernadette"
May 18, 1960 - "Do You Mind?", "Dreamsville"
October 17, 1960 - "(In the Summertime) You Don't Want My Love", "Don't Go to Strangers"
March 9, 1961 - "The Bilbao Song", "How Wonderful to Know"

Personnel 

Andy Williams - vocalist
Archie Bleyer - arranger, conductor

References

Bibliography

1965 compilation albums
Andy Williams compilation albums
Columbia Records compilation albums
Albums arranged by Archie Bleyer
Albums conducted by Archie Bleyer